Works of Love is a work by Søren Kierkegaard written in 1847. It is one of the works which he published under his own name, as opposed to his more famous "pseudonymous" works. Works of Love deals primarily with the Christian conception of  love in contrast with erotic love or preferential love given to friends and family. Kierkegaard uses this value/virtue to understand the existence and relationship of the individual Christian. Having helped found Existentialism, he uses it and a high-level of theology citing the scriptures of the Christian Bible.  Many of the chapters take a mention of love from the New Testament and center reflections about the transfer of individuals from secular modes (the stages of the aesthetic and ethical) to genuine religious experience and existence.  Since human experience is a key to understanding Kierkegaard, the actual relationships and experiences of disciples and of Christ are characterized here as tangible models for behavior.

Kierkegaard as a Christian ethicist (represented by this work) is likely to be considered distinct from many ways in which the religion's mainstream seems to function from the viewpoint of an outside observer.  This is not only a function of Christian existentialism but also of his time period and political events occurring in his native Denmark.

Themes
Part One — Topics include: Love's Hidden Life and Its Recognisability by its Fruits,  You Shall Love, You Shall Love Your Neighbor, Love is the Fulfilling of the Law, Love is a Matter of Conscience, Our Duty to Love Those We See, and Our Duty to be in the Debt of Love to Each Other
Part Two — Topics include: Love Builds up, Love Believes all Things and Yet is Never Deceived, Love Hopes all Things and Yet is Never Put to Shame, Love Seeks Not its Own, Love Hides The Multiplicity of Sins,  Love Abides, Mercifulness, a Work of Love, Even if it Can Give Nothing and Is Capable of Doing Nothing, The Victory of Reconciliation in Love Which Wins the Vanquished, The work of Love in Remembering One Dead, and The Work of Love in Praising Love

Style
The Works as Kierkegaard himself states are Christian reflections and not discourses. It is written in a rhetorical style where he often repeats his words and gives numerous examples.

External links
 
 Works of Love, Swenson translation, 1972 edition
 Works of Love, Howard Hong's 1962 translation Google Books
 Works of Love, George Pattison's 2009 translation
 Works of Love, Princeton University Press, 2013 Hong translation'
 M. Jamie Ferreira, Love's Grateful Striving : A Commentary on Kierkegaard's Works of Love 2001
Storm's commentary on Works of Love

1847 books
Books about the philosophy of love
Books by Søren Kierkegaard